Galomecalpa concolor is a species of moth of the family Tortricidae. It is found in Tungurahua Province, Ecuador.

The wingspan is 21 mm. The ground colour of the forewings is cream, suffused and finely strigulated (finely streaked) with brownish. The markings are brown. The hindwings are cream, tinged with pale brownish and with brownish strigulation.

Etymology
The species name refers to the external similarity to most of the species of Galomecalpa and is derived from Latin concolor (meaning similar in colour).

References

Moths described in 2006
Euliini
Moths of South America
Taxa named by Józef Razowski